The ANNIKA Invitational Europe is an annual amateur golf tournament in Sweden for European girls under 18. 

The tournament, founded by Annika Sörenstam in 2012, is a qualifying event for the European team in the Junior Solheim Cup since 2015 and has been rated up to level "A" in the World Amateur Golf Ranking.

Format
The tournament is stroke play over 54 holes, 18 holes on each day of the tournament, with no cut. In addition to twelve exemptions and open entries to make up the field of 78, the top 48 players on the World Amateur Golf Ranking at the start of the year who also represents a country that is a member of the European Golf Association are invited.

Winners

Source:

References

External links
Annika Foundation Europe

Junior golf tournaments
Amateur golf tournaments
Golf tournaments in Sweden